Xolani Mlambo (born 24 June 1991 in Johannesburg) is a South African football midfielder who plays for TS Galaxy in the South African Premier Division.

References

1991 births
Living people
South African soccer players
Association football midfielders
Orlando Pirates F.C. players
AmaZulu F.C. players
Cape Town All Stars players
Chippa United F.C. players
Bidvest Wits F.C. players
TS Galaxy F.C. players
South African Premier Division players
National First Division players